is a trans-Neptunian object of the scattered disc, approximately 148 kilometers in diameter. It was discovered on 6 September 1999, by American astronomers Chad Trujillo, Jane Luu, and David Jewitt at the Mauna Kea Observatories, Hawaii.

Orbit and classification 

 orbits from the center of the Kuiper belt to well beyond into the scattered disc. It orbits the Sun at a distance of 37.5–204.4 AU once every 1330 years and 7 months (485,993 days; semi-major axis of 121 AU). Its orbit has an eccentricity of 0.69 and an inclination of 26° with respect to the ecliptic. The body's observation arc begins with its official discovery observation.

Diameter and albedo 

According to the Johnston's Archive and Michael Brown,  measures 147 and 148 kilometers in diameter, and its surface has an estimated albedo of 0.09 and 0.08, respectively.

See also 
 List of Solar System objects by greatest aphelion

References

External links 
 Asteroid Lightcurve Database (LCDB), query form (info )
 Discovery Circumstances: Numbered Minor Planets (180001)-(185000) – Minor Planet Center
 
 

181902
Discoveries by Chad Trujillo
Discoveries by Jane Luu
Discoveries by David C. Jewitt
19990906